Corina Morariu and Larisa Neiland were the defending champions but did not return to defend their title.

Rachel McQuillan and Lisa McShea won in the final 6–3, 7–6(7–3) against Cara Black and Irina Selyutina.

Seeds
Champion seeds are indicated in bold text while text in italics indicates the round in which those seeds were eliminated. The top four seeded teams received byes into the second round.

Main draw

Finals

Top half

Bottom half

Qualifying draw

References
 2000 DFS Classic Draws
 ITF Tournament Page 
 ITF doubles results page
 ITF doubles qualifying results page

DFS Classic - Doubles
Doubles